Chennai Om Sri Skandashramam is a Hindu temple dedicated to the deity Murugan (Swaminatha Swami) in Chennai, India. It is located at Selaiyur, Tambaram, a southern neighbourhood of Chennai. The temple is known of its huge idols of several deities, including Kamala Siddhi Vinayakar, Panchamukha Heramba Ganapathy, Dattatreya, Panchamukha Hanuman, Shaniswara, Ayyapan, goddess Ashtadashabhuja Durga Parameswari, Sarabeswara (form of Shiva), goddess Prathiyankira, goddess Bhuvaneshwari, Swaminathaswamy (chief deity at the temple), Sudarshanachakathalwar, Lakshmi Narasimhar, Maha Sahasralingamurthy (1008 lingams), Nandikeswarar, goddess Annapurani and Chakra Poorna Maha Meru. There is also an idol of Saint Sathguru Santhananda Swamigal, who built the temple.

History
Chennai Om Sri Skandhashramam temple was consecrated by Saint Swami Santhananda on 24 June 1999. Before building the temple at Chennai, Shanthananda Swamigal also built the Judge Swamigal Adhishtanam at Pudukkottai, Om Sri Skandasramam at Salem and Dattagiri at Sendamangalam. The temple is dedicated to goddess Ugraprathyangira Devi and god Sarabheswara. This is said to be the first temple in India to have been dedicated to goddess Ugraprathyangira Devi. It is also said to be the first temple of god Sarabheswara constructed in modern times. There is an old Chola temple dedicated to Lord Sarabheswara at Thribhuvanam near Thanjavur, also in Tamil Nadu. Swami Santhananda died before the completion of the temple.

Idols
There are life-size idols of various gods and goddesses in the temple, some of them larger-than-life sized. The most imposing of all is the Sahasralingam, a huge stone lingam (form of God Shiva) measuring 9.5 feet in height and weighing 20 tons, which has 1007 lingams carved within, with a Nandhi (the bull) measuring 5 feet long and 4 feet high facing the lingam. Other deities in the temple are Panchamukha Heramba Ganapathy, Kamala Siddhi Vinayakar, Bhuvaneshwari Amman, Panchamukha Aanjaneyar, Veera Sarabeswarar, Saniswarar, Swaminathaswamy (Skanda), Dattatreyar, Prathyankara Devi, Sri Chakra Maha Meru, Ayyapan, Ashtadasabhuja Durga Parameswari, Sudarshana Chakrathazhwar, Lakshmi Narasimhar.

The meditation hall is located at the forecourt in front of the sanctums (Sannidhies) of the four main deities. The hall accommodates the Maha Meru (Sri Chakra) at its centre.

Developments
In June 2012, the temple started the Guru Vyasa Veda Patasala, a centre to learn Vedas.

References

External links
 Official website of Chennai Om Sri Skandhashramam
 Life and Times of Swami Santhananda

1999 establishments in Tamil Nadu
Hindu temples in Chennai
Murugan temples in Tamil Nadu